Laoreicheia is a genus of beetle in the family Carabidae.

It contains the following species:
 Laoreicheia bartolozzii Magrini & Bulirsch, 2020
 Laoreicheia bulirschi Balkenohl, 2005

References

Scaritinae